Erasmuskloof is a suburb in the east of the city of Pretoria, South Africa.  It borders the suburbs of Constantia Park, Waterkloof Glen, Moreleta Park, Elardus Park, Erasmus Park, Erasmusrand and Waterkloof Glen.

Erasmuskloof is positioned near the N1 highway and major shopping malls Menlyn Park, Menlyn Retail Park, Menlyn Maine, coffee bars, restaurants, cafés and Castle Walk Shopping Centre.

Primary schools

 Hatfield Christian School
 Laerskool Garsfontein
 Laerskool Constantiapark
 Laerskool Elarduspark
 Glenstantia Primary

Secondary schools

 Hatfield Christian School
 The Glen High School
 Hoërskool Die Wilgers
 Hoërskool Eldoraigne
 Hoërskool Garsfontein
 Hoërskool Menlopark
 Hoërskool Waterkloof
 Pro Arte Alphen Park

Tertiary education

References

Suburbs of Pretoria